Kidnapping by Indians is a 1899 British silent short Western film, made by the Mitchell and Kenyon film company, shot in Blackburn, England. It is believed to be the first dramatic film in the Western genre, pre-dating Edwin S. Porter's The Great Train Robbery by four years.

Background
According to Jamie Holman, a local researcher, James Kenyon of Mitchell & Kenyon met some Americans in Blackburn when he was a boy. This sparked his interest in the "Wild West" and ultimately led to the production of this film. The British Film Institute (BFI) questions the ethnicity of the costumes used but Holman has maintained that they are authentic as tomahawks, head-dress and other Western stereotypes are in evidence. Holman says many cotton workers from Blackburn went to America after the American Civil War and brought back stories of the wild frontier which whetted local interest. He says: "Mitchell and Kenyon would have been aware of the appetite for the Wild West at the time". The film was shot in the countryside near Blackburn and used local actors. It is noted for its innovative use of techniques such as composite editing and frequent camera movement.

According to Bryony Dixon, a curator at the BFI, Kidnapping By Indians is a significant film in the Western genre. The storyline of a white girl being kidnapped by Indians is in The Last of the Mohicans and many Wild West productions such as The Searchers. Ms Dixon admits the film lacks some of the usual Western elements but, as she says, so does The Great Train Robbery.

Plot
The plot concerns an attack by Native Americans on a camp where white people are staying. The attackers set fire to the camp and kidnap a young girl. Some cowboys arrive and a gunfight begins. The captured girl is rescued by the cowboys. The BFI suggests the film may be a scene from a larger stage production.

See also
 List of Western films before 1920

References

External links
 
 

1899 films
1899 short films
1890s British films
1899 Western (genre) films
British silent short films
British black-and-white films
Films shot in Lancashire
Films directed by Mitchell & Kenyon
Silent British Western (genre) films
Films about Native Americans
Films about kidnapping in the United States